Everybody's Acting is a lost 1926 American drama silent film directed by Marshall Neilan and written by Marshall Neilan, Benjamin Glazer and George Marion Jr. The film stars Betty Bronson, Ford Sterling, Louise Dresser, Lawrence Gray, Henry B. Walthall, Raymond Hitchcock and Stuart Holmes. The film was released on November 8, 1926, by Paramount Pictures.

Plot

"Doris Poole, whose parents were theatrical people, was orphaned as a child, and four members of the troupe adopted and raised her. When grown, she has become the leading lady in a San Francisco stock-company. She meets and falls in love with Ted, the millionaire son of a rich widow, but she thinks he is only a tax-cab driver. His mother objects to the romance and looks into Doris' past. She learns that her father had murdered, in a fit of jealousy, her mother, and tells Doris what she has found out. The four actors who had raised her had never told her how she happened to become an orphan. They persuade Ted's mother to send him on a voyage to the Orient in order to get him away from Doris. But they neglected to tell the mother they had also booked passage for Doris on the same ship."

Cast 
Betty Bronson as Doris Poole
Ford Sterling as Michael Poole
Louise Dresser as Anastasia Potter
Lawrence Gray as Ted Potter
Henry B. Walthall as Thorpe
Raymond Hitchcock as Ernest Rice
Stuart Holmes as Clayton Budd
Edward Martindel as Peter O'Brien
Philo McCullough as Paul Singlton
Jed Prouty	as Bridwell Potter
Jocelyn Lee as Barbara Potter

References

External links 
 
 

1926 films
1920s English-language films
Silent American drama films
1926 drama films
Paramount Pictures films
Films directed by Marshall Neilan
American black-and-white films
Lost American films
American silent feature films
1926 lost films
Lost drama films
1920s American films